Live is a live album by the electronic band Lycia. It was released in 1994 on Projekt Records.

Track listing

Personnel
Adapted from the Live liner notes.
David Galas – synthesizer
Sam Rosenthal – photography, design
Mike VanPortfleet – vocals, synthesizer, guitar

Release History

References

External links
 

1994 live albums
Lycia (band) albums
Projekt Records live albums